Sir Thomas Bludder (died 29 September 1655) was an English politician who sat in the House of Commons  variously between 1621 and 1640.

Bludder was the son of Sir Thomas Bludder of Flanchford Reigate, and his wife Mary Herries, the daughter of Christopher Herries, of Shenfield, Margaretting, Essex. His father was a commissioner of the Victualling Office. He matriculated at Christ's College, Cambridge, in 1614 and graduated BA in  1617.  He was admitted to the Inner Temple in 1616 and was knighted in 1618.

In 1621 Bludder was elected Member of Parliament for Gatton. He was elected Member for Reigate in 1624, 1625, 1626 and 1628. He sat until 1629, after which King Charles ruled without Parliament for eleven years. From 1627 to 1628 he was Surveyor of the Ordnance, a Crown appointment.

In April 1640, Bludder was again elected Member for Reigate in the Short Parliament.  He was a benefactor of Christ's College.

Bludder died in 1655 and was commemorated by a tablet over the vestry door of the church of St Mary Magdalene Reigate.

Bludder married three times. His third wife who survived him was Elizabeth Bret daughter of Robert Bret.

References

 
 

Year of birth missing
1655 deaths
English MPs 1621–1622
English MPs 1624–1625
English MPs 1625
English MPs 1626
English MPs 1628–1629
English MPs 1640 (April)